Slavětín nad Metují is a municipality and village in Náchod District in the Hradec Králové Region of the Czech Republic. It has about 300 inhabitants. It lies on the Metuje River.

References

Villages in Náchod District